Ong Sai Hung (born 21 February 1999 in Perlis) is a Malaysian professional squash player. He attended SJKC Chung Hwa Jitra. As of October 2019, he was ranked number 174 in the world. He has competed in the main draw of multiple professional PSA tournaments. He has represented Malaysia internationally.

References

1999 births
Living people
Malaysian male squash players
Malaysian people of Hokkien descent
Malaysian people of Chinese descent
People from Perlis
Southeast Asian Games medalists in squash
Southeast Asian Games gold medalists for Malaysia
Competitors at the 2019 Southeast Asian Games
21st-century Malaysian people